Flying Bark Productions Pty Ltd is an Australian animation studio. The studio acts as a full-service production facility across feature films, television and a diverse range of digital content. The studio was established by Yoram and Sandra Gross in 1967 as Yoram Gross Film Studios.

Filmography

Flying Bark Productions feature films
Gumnutz: A Juicy Tale (2007) (with Bix Pix Productions and ABC Studios)
Santa's Apprentice (2010) (with Gaumont Alphanim)
The Woodlies Movie (2013)
Maya the Bee Movie (2014)
Blinky Bill the Movie (2015)
Maya the Bee: The Honey Games (2018)
100% Wolf (2020)
Maya the Bee: The Golden Orb (2021)
Rise of the Teenage Mutant Ninja Turtles: The Movie (2022) (with Nickelodeon Movies and Netflix)
Mia and Me: The Hero of Centopia (2022)

Flying Bark Productions TV series
Dive, Olly, Dive! (2005) (with Mike Young Productions)
Staines Down Drains (2006) (with Flux Animation and NZ On Air)
Zeke's Pad (2008) (with Leaping Lizard Productions, Bardel Entertainment, Avrill Stark Entertainment, YTV Pictures, and Seven Network)
Master Raindrop (2008–2009) (with Big Communications, Flux Animation Studio, Media Development Authority, and Southern Star Entertainment)
Legend of Enyo (2009–2010) (with Avrill Stark Entertainment, Screen NSW, and Seven Network)
Zigby (2009–2013) (with Avrill Stark Entertainment and Big Animation)
Florrie's Dragons (2010–2011)
The Woodlies (2012)
Maya the Bee (2012–2017)
Vic the Viking (2013–2014)
Tashi (2014–2015)
Heidi (2015–2016)
The Wild Adventures of Blinky Bill (2016–2017)
Oh, Yuck! (2017) (with Silhouette Media Group)
Rise of the Teenage Mutant Ninja Turtles (2018–2020) (animation services)
Glitch Techs (2020) (animation services)
Lego Monkie Kid (2020–present) 
What If...? (2021) (with Marvel Studios)
FriendZSpace (2022–present)
Moon Girl and Devil Dinosaur (2023–present)

Web series
 The Eggsperts (2014)

Yoram Gross feature films
Dot and the Kangaroo (1977)
The Little Convict (1979) (also known as Toby and the Koala)
Around the World with Dot (1981) (also known as Dot and Santa Claus)
Sarah (1982) (also known as The Seventh Match and Sarah and the Squirrel)
Dot and the Bunny (1983)
The Camel Boy (1984)
Epic (1984) (also known as Epic: Days of the Dinosaur)
Dot and the Koala (1985)
Dot and Keeto (1986)
Dot and the Whale (1986)
Dot and the Smugglers (1987) (also known as Dot and the Bunyip)
Dot Goes to Hollywood (1987)
The Magic Riddle (1991) (with Beyond International)
Blinky Bill: The Mischievous Koala (1992)
Dot in Space (1994)
Skippy Saves Bushtown (1999)
Tabaluga and Leo (2005)
Blinky Bill's White Christmas (2005)
Flipper and Lopaka: The Feature (2006)

Yoram Gross TV series
Bright Sparks (1989) (with Beyond International Group)
The Adventures of Blinky Bill (1993)
Blinky Bill's Extraordinary Excursion (1995)
Samuel and Nina (1996–1997) (with Children's Television Workshop and Cartoon Network Productions)
Tabaluga (1997–2004) (with ZDF Enterprises)
Skippy: Adventures in Bushtown (1998–1999) (also known as Skippy: Adventures in Bushland)
Dumb Bunnies (1998–1999) (with Nelvana and Scholastic)
Flipper and Lopaka (1999–2005)
Fairy Tale Police Department (2001–2002)
Old Tom (2002) (with Millimages)
Bambaloo (2003–2004) (with The Jim Henson Company)
Art Alive (2003–2005)
Seaside Hotel (2003–2005)
Blinky Bill (2004) (also known as Blinky Bill's Extraordinary Balloon Adventure and Blinky Bill's Around the World Adventures)
Deadly (2006) (with SLR Productions)

TV special
 The Adventures of Candy Claus (1987)

Interactive board game
Atmosfear (2004)

See also

References

External links
Official website
Flying Bark Productions at IMDb
Yoram Gross Films at IMDb
Yoram Gross-EM.TV at IMDb

Australian animation studios
Mass media companies established in 1967
Australian subsidiaries of foreign companies
Blinky Bill